(The New Testament in Greek) is a critical edition of the New Testament in its original Koine Greek, forming the basis of most modern Bible translations and biblical criticism. It is also known as the Nestle–Aland edition after its most influential editors, Eberhard Nestle and Kurt Aland. The text, edited by the Institute for New Testament Textual Research, is currently in its 28th edition, abbreviated NA28.

The title is sometimes applied to the United Bible Societies (UBS) edition, which contains the same text (its fifth edition, "UBS5", contains the text from NA28). The UBS edition is aimed at translators and so focuses on variants that are important for the meaning whereas the NA includes more variants.

The release of a 29th edition is expected in 2024.

Methodology 

The Greek text as presented is what biblical scholars refer to as the "critical text". The critical text is an eclectic text compiled by a committee that compares readings from a large number of manuscripts in order to determine which reading is most likely to be closest to the original. They use a number of factors to help determine probable readings, such as the date of the witness (earlier is usually better), the geographical distribution of a reading, and the likelihood of accidental or intentional corruptions. In the book, a large number of textual variants, or differences between manuscripts, are noted in the critical apparatus—the extensive footnotes that distinguish the Novum Testamentum Graece from other Greek New Testaments.

Most scholars view uncial text as the most accurate; however, a few authors, such as New Testament scholar Maurice A. Robinson and linguist Wilbur Pickering, Arthur Farstad and Zane C. Hodges claim that the minuscule texts (the Byzantine text-type) more accurately reflect the "autographs" or original texts than an eclectic text like NA28 that relies heavily on manuscripts of the Alexandrian text-type. This view has been criticized by Gordon Fee and Bruce Metzger among others. Since the majority of old manuscripts in existence are minuscules, they are often referred to as the Majority Text. It is worth noting, though, that the Majority Text as a whole is classified by the editors of the NA28 (of whom Metzger is one) as a "consistently cited witness of the first order," meaning that whenever the text presented differs from the majority text this is recorded in the apparatus along with the alternate reading. Other consistently cited references include the full corpus of papyrus manuscripts available to the authors as well as a wide range of other manuscripts including a selection of both minuscules and uncials.

The Novum Testamentum Graece apparatus summarizes the evidence (from manuscripts and versions) for, and sometimes against, a selection of the most important variants for the study of the text of the New Testament. While eschewing completeness (in the range of variants and in the citation of witnesses), this edition does provide informed readers with a basis by which they can judge for themselves which readings more accurately reflect the originals. The Greek text of the 28th edition is the same as that of the 5th edition of the United Bible Societies The Greek New Testament (abbreviated UBS5) although there are a few differences between them in paragraphing, capitalization, punctuation and spelling. The critical apparatus is different in the two editions; the UBS5 edition is prepared for the use of translators, and includes fewer textual variants, but adds extra material helpful for translators.

Editions

History
The first edition published by Eberhard Nestle in 1898 combined the readings of the editions of Tischendorf, Westcott and Hort and Weymouth, placing the majority reading of these in the text and the third reading in the apparatus. In 1901, he replaced the Weymouth New Testament with Bernhard Weiss's text. In later editions, Nestle began noting the attestation of certain important manuscripts in his apparatus.

Eberhard's son Erwin Nestle took over after his father's death and issued the 13th edition in 1927. This edition introduced a separate critical apparatus and finally introduced consistency to the majority reading principle. In the apparatus only a few minuscules were included.

Kurt Aland became the associate editor of the 21st edition in 1952. At Erwin Nestle's request, he reviewed and expanded the critical apparatus, adding many more manuscripts. This eventually led to the 25th edition of 1963. The most important Papyri and newly discovered Uncials, as 0189, a few Minuscules (33, 614, 2814), occasionally also lectionaries were taken into account.

The great manuscript discoveries of the 20th century had also made a revision of the text necessary and, with Nestle's permission, Aland set out to revise the text of Novum Testamentum Graece. Aland submitted his work on NA to the editorial committee of the United Bible Societies Greek New Testament (of which he was also a member) and it became the basic text of their third edition (UBS3) in 1975, four years before it was published as the 26th edition of Nestle–Aland.

Members of the Editorial Committee of the United Bible Societies' Greek New Testament comprise:
 UBS1, 1966
 Kurt Aland, Matthew Black, Bruce Metzger, Allen Wikgren.
 UBS2, 1968
 Kurt Aland, Matthew Black, Bruce Metzger, Allen Wikgren.
 UBS3, 1975
 Kurt Aland, Matthew Black, Carlo Maria Martini, Bruce Metzger, Allen Wikgren.
 UBS4, 1993
 Barbara Aland, Kurt Aland, Johannes Karavidopoulos, Carlo Maria Martini, Bruce Metzger
 UBS5, 2014
 Barbara Aland, Kurt Aland, Johannes Karavidopoulos, Carlo Maria Martini, Bruce Metzger in co-operation with the Institute for New Testament Textual Research, Münster

In 2011 the Global Board of the United Bible Societies appointed a new editorial committee that will prepare future editions of the Nestle–Aland Novum Testamentum Graece as well as of the Greek New Testament. The committee consists of Christos Karakolis (University of Athens, Greece), David Parker (University of Birmingham, United Kingdom), Stephen Pisano (Pontifical Biblical Institute, Italy, a university of the Holy See), Holger Strutwolf (University Münster, Germany), David Trobisch (Museum of the Bible/Green Collection Oklahoma City, USA) and Klaus Wachtel (University Münster, Germany).

In all but the Catholic Epistles, the 28th edition of Nestle–Aland reproduces the text of NA27 (the same text used in UBS4 and UBS5) and presents a revised critical apparatus and a rewritten introduction and appendices. In the Catholic Epistles, the text has been edited in line with the Editio Critica Maior and its use of the Coherence-Based Genealogical Method (CBGM). The result is a change in just over 30 places.

A more complete set of variants is listed in the multiple volume Novum Testamentum Graecum – Editio Critica Maior. A small number of textual changes in the most current edition were incorporated in the 28th edition of the Nestle–Aland, published in 2012. Papyri 117-127 were used in this edition.

Current editions

The NA28 text is published by Deutsche Bibelgesellschaft (the German Bible Society).
Greek:
Novum Testamentum Graece, Standard 28th edition,  (2012).
Novum Testamentum Graece, Large Print 27th edition,  (1993).
Novum Testamentum Graece, Wide Margin 27th edition, 
Novum Testamentum Graece, 28th edition with A Concise Greek-English Dictionary of the New Testament (by B. M. Newman),  
Novum Testamentum Graece, 28th edition with Greek-German Dictionary, 
Biblia Sacra Utriusque Testamenti Editio Hebraica et Graeca (NA27 with the Biblia Hebraica Stuttgartensia), 
Diglot:
Das Neue Testament Griechisch und Deutsch,  (with revised Luther and Common Bible in parallel columns)
Nestle–Aland Greek-English New Testament,  (with Revised Standard Version, 2nd edition)
New English Translation-Novum Testamentum Graece New Testament, 
Novum Testamentum Graece et Latine,  (with Nova Vulgata)
Nuovo Testamento Greco-Italiano,  (with the Versione Conferenza Episcopale Italiana)

Accuracy of manuscripts 

In The Text of the New Testament, Kurt Aland and Barbara Aland compare the total number of variant-free verses, and the number of variants per page (excluding orthographic errors), among the seven major editions of the Greek NT (Tischendorf, Westcott-Hort, von Soden, Vogels, Merk, Bover, and Nestle–Aland) concluding 62.9%, or 4999/7947, agreement. They concluded, "Thus in nearly two-thirds of the New Testament text, the seven editions of the Greek New Testament which we have reviewed are in complete accord, with no differences other than in orthographical details (e.g., the spelling of names, etc.). Verses in which any one of the seven editions differs by a single word are not counted. This result is quite amazing, demonstrating a far greater agreement among the Greek texts of the New Testament during the past century than textual scholars would have suspected […]. In the Gospels, Acts, and Revelation the agreement is less, while in the letters it is much greater."  For over 250 years, New Testament apologists have argued that no textual variant affects key Christian doctrine.

Influence 

Earlier translations of the Bible, including the King James Version, tended to rely on Byzantine type texts, such as the Textus Receptus. A number of translations began to use critical Greek editions, beginning with the translation of the Revised Version in England in 1881–1885 (using Westcott and Hort's Greek Text). English translations produced during the twentieth century increasingly reflected the work of textual criticism, although even new translations are often influenced by earlier translation efforts.

A comparison of the textual and stylistic choices of twenty translations against 15,000 variant readings shows the following rank of agreement with the Nestle–Aland 27th edition:

See also 
 Alexandrian text-type
 Byzantine text-type
 Caesarean text-type
 List of Bible verses not included in modern translations
 List of major textual variants in the New Testament
 Textual criticism
 Textus Receptus
 Westcott-Hort
 Western text-type

References

Bibliography

External links 
 Official Novum Testamentum Graece (28th ed., 2012) text on www.academic-bible.com
"The Novum Testamentum Graece (Nestle–Aland) and its history" on www.academic-bible.com
 Official Institute for New Testament Textual Research (Institut für Neutestamentliche Textforschung, INTF) website
 Comparison of the Novum Testamentum Graece (NA27/UBS4) text with other manuscript editions on the Manuscript Comparator
 Nestle's "The Greek New Testament (1904 ed.)" text digitized on biblicaltext.com
 Nestle's "The Greek New Testament (1904 ed.)" preserved on archive.org with critical apparatus

Biblical criticism
Christian terminology
Greek New Testament
New Testament editions